Mahanga (Sl. No.: 95) is a Vidhan Sabha constituency of Cuttack district, Odisha.

This constituency includes Mahanga block and 26 Gram panchayats (Fagola, Ramakrushnpur, Jignipur, Nischintakoili, Narendrapur, Nagaspur, Daudpur, Sukarpada, Asureswar, Taratasasan, Palisahi, Jamara, Orti, Kentalo, Baliapada, Kerilo, Buhalo, Kendupatana, Jhadeswarpur, Bandhakatia, Natakai, Kolanpur, Katikata, Katarpara, Jairampur, Barado and Sarapada) Nischintakoili block.

Elected Members

Fourteen elections were held between 1951 and 2019 including one By election in 1955.
Elected members from the Mahanga constituency are:

 2019: (95): Pratap Jena (BJD)
2014: (95): Pratap Jena (BJD)
 2009: (95): Pratap Jena (BJD)
2004: (40): Bikram Keshari Barma (BJD)
2000: (40): Sarat Kumar Kar (BJD)
1995: (40): Shaik Matlub Ali (Congress)
1990: (40): Sarat Kumar Kar (Janata Dal)
1985: (40): Shaik Matlub Ali (Congress)
1980: (40): Shaik Matlub Ali (Congress-I)
1977: (40): Pradipta Kishore Das (Janata Party)
1974: (40): Shaik Matlub Ali (Congress)
1971: (39): Sarat Kumar Kar (Utkal Congress)
1967: (39): Biraj Parasad Roy (PSP)
1961: (104): Surendranath Patnaik (Congress)
1955: (By Poll):Pradipta Kishore Das (PSP)
1951: (77): Mahammad Attahar (Congress)

2014 Election Result
In 2014 election, Biju Janata Dal candidate Pratap Jena defeated Independent candidate Sarada Prasad Padhan by a margin of 27,874 votes.

2009 Election Results
In 2009 election, Biju Janata Dal candidate Pratap Jena defeated Indian National Congress candidate Shaik Matlub Ali by a margin of 29,220 votes.

Notes

References

Assembly constituencies of Odisha
Politics of Cuttack district